Gyaing River is a river of Kayin State and Mon State, in southeastern Burma (Myanmar).

The Gyaing is a wide river, but quite shallow with numerous sandbars. It is navigable by smaller boats all year long. Important towns and villages along its banks include Gadoe (Kado), Zathabyin (Zathabyeng), Kalagong, Kawbein, Peinnegon, Tarana and Damathat (Dhammatha). The up-stream Gyaing forms part of the border between Hpa-an District and Kawkareik District of Kayin State, and downstream is the border between Kayin State and Mon State.

Notes

Further reading
 Finch, Roger (2006) "Journey up the Gyaing" Stations of the Sun Somerset Hall Press, Boston, Massachusetts, page 91, ; poem

Rivers of Myanmar
Salween River